Osman Arpacıoğlu (5 January 1947 – 5 December 2021) was a Turkish professional footballer. He has played as forward position. He started his professional career with Hacettepespor and he also played for Mersin İdman Yurdu,
Fenerbahçe and Balıkesirspor.

In 1972–73 season, he was the top scorer of the league.

He scored 200th goal of Turkey against Algeria on 14 February 1973.

He finished his career on 9 June 1980 with Balıkesirspor-Fenerbahçe match.

Awards
 Turkish League (2): 1973–74, 1974–75
 Turkish Cup (1): 1974
 Presidents Cup (2): 1973, 1975
 Chancellor Cup (1): 1973
 TSYD Cup (3): 1974, 1976, 1977
 League Top Scorer (1): 1972-73

References

1947 births
2021 deaths
Footballers from Ankara
Turkish footballers
Turkey international footballers
Hacettepe S.K. footballers
Mersin İdman Yurdu footballers
Fenerbahçe S.K. footballers
Balıkesirspor footballers
Association football midfielders